Natalie Pawelski is an American journalist and television correspondent.  From 1997 to 2003, she was an environmental correspondent for CNN.

A graduate of Georgetown University and the Columbia School of Journalism, she got her start at CNN working for Headline News as a writer and producer.  She eventually became host of the award-winning CNN environment magazine program "Earth Matters."  She also worked on the TBS show "News for Kids".  In 2003, she was a Nieman Fellow at Harvard University.

From 2006 to March 2010, she was worked as the Vice Consul for Press, Political, and Public Affairs at the British Consulate-General in Atlanta. She left in March 2010 to work for Cater Communications.  In 2014, she became a regular guest on Georgia Public Broadcasting's radio show "On Second Thought."

References

Year of birth missing (living people)
Living people
Nieman Fellows
Georgetown University alumni
Columbia University Graduate School of Journalism  alumni